Poor People's Day is a solo studio album by American hip hop musician Bigg Jus, a former member of Company Flow. It was released on Mush Records in 2005. The album is entirely produced by DJ Gman.

Critical reception

Stewart Mason of AllMusic gave the album 4.5 stars out of 5, calling it "the rapper's most immediately accessible album, with less fractured, smoother beats and fewer outlandish arrangements underneath his lyrics." He added, "Those lyrics are as uncompromising as ever, but the friendlier settings make Bigg Jus' position statements and character studies sound easier to get into than ever before, which increases their strength considerably."

Owen Strock of CMJ New Music Monthly described it as "an anti-globalization opus of dusty beats and multi-syllabic rhymes that sound like Ghostface, RZA and Noam Chomsky having a threeway."

Track listing

References

External links
 

2005 albums
Bigg Jus albums
Mush Records albums